Martin Crête (born March 12, 1985) is a Canadian curler from Lévis, Quebec. He was the long time third for Jean-Michel Ménard from 2007 to 2018.

Career
Crête played as a competitive junior skip near the beginning of his career, finishing as the runner-up at the 2002 Canadian Junior Curling Championships and in third place at the 2003 Canadian Junior Curling Championships. He also skipped Team Quebec at the 2004, 2005, and 2006 Canadian Junior Championships, finishing sixth, fourth, and fourth, respectively. He also competed in the 2006 Quebec men's provincial championship, finishing tied for fifth after a loss to Pierre Charette in the playoffs.

After he joined Jean-Michel Ménard as third, Crête went to his first Brier in 2008, where he represented Quebec under Ménard. They finished in sixth place with a 4–7 win–loss record. The team returned the next year, finishing in fifth place with a 7–4 win–loss record after losing the tiebreaker for the fourth place playoff spot against Manitoba's Jeff Stoughton. Crête and the rest of the team won the Quebec provincials again in 2013 and returned to the Brier, where, after a strong start, they finished in sixth place with a 6–5 win–loss record. The team won the Quebec Tankard again in 2014, and had a strong performance at the 2014 Tim Hortons Brier, finishing 7–4 in the round robin, winning the 3–4 game, but losing in semifinal and the bronze medal game. The team won their third straight provincial Tankard in 2015. At the 2015 Tim Hortons Brier, they had to settle with a 6–5 record, missing the playoffs. They won a fourth straight Quebec Tankard in 2016, but had a rather lackluster 2016 Tim Hortons Brier, finishing with a 4–7 record. The team won their final Tankard in 2017 together. They had a strong performance at the 2017 Tim Hortons Brier, finishing with a 7–4 record, but that year it was not good enough to make the playoffs. The team lost in the final of the 2018 provincials to Mike Fournier, and did not make that year's Brier. At the end of the season, Ménard retired from competitive curling and Crête took over the team as skip. Replacing Crête at third would be Philippe Lemay.

In their first Tankard with their new lineup, Crête beat Fournier in the final, and represented Quebec at the 2019 Tim Hortons Brier, where he led Team Quebec to a 3–4 finish, missing the championship round. The following season, his team only played in one event, the 2019 La Classique Ville de Levis, where they lost in the final to Vincent Roberge.

Crête joined the Mike Fournier team for the 2020–21 season. Due to the COVID-19 pandemic in Quebec, the 2021 provincial championship was cancelled. Curling Québec then decided to appoint Team Fournier to represent Quebec at the 2021 Tim Hortons Brier in Calgary, Alberta. The event was played in a bio-secure bubble to prevent the spread of the virus. At the Brier, they finished with a 4–4 record, failing to qualify for the championship round.

In their first event of the 2021–22 season, Team Fournier reached the final of the Capital Curling Fall Open. Because of their previous successes on tour, the team had enough points to qualify for the 2021 Canadian Olympic Curling Pre-Trials. At the Pre-Trials, the team finished the round robin with a 3–3 record, missing the playoff round. Later in the season, they won the Challenge Casino de Charlevoix and reached the final of both the Stu Sells 1824 Halifax Classic and the Finale du Circuit. The Quebec Tankard was once again cancelled due to the pandemic and Team Fournier were named as the provinces representatives for the 2022 Tim Hortons Brier. At the Brier, the team finished once again with a 4–4, placing sixth in their pool. Following the season, skip Mike Fournier moved to Ontario and Félix Asselin took over as skip of the team with Émile Asselin coming in to play second.

Personal life
Crête lives in Lévis, Quebec. He works as a Business Intelligence architect for Desjardins Group. He is married to fellow curler Véronique Brassard and has three children.

References

External links
 Team Ménard website
 

1985 births
Living people
Curlers from Quebec
Sportspeople from Quebec City
People from Lévis, Quebec
Canadian male curlers